Cyclamen (Hungarian:Ciklámen) is a 1916 Hungarian silent film directed by Alexander Korda.

References

Bibliography
 Kulik, Karol. Alexander Korda: The Man Who Could Work Miracles. Virgin Books, 1990.

External links

1916 films
Hungarian silent films
1910s Hungarian-language films
Films directed by Alexander Korda
Hungarian black-and-white films
Austro-Hungarian films